Gennady Viktorovich Vaganov (born November 25, 1930 in the village of Duvan, Duvansky District, Bashkir ASSR) was a Soviet cross-country skier who competed during the early 1960s, training at the Armed Forces sports society in Moscow. He earned two bronze medals in the 4x10 km relay at the 1960 Winter Olympics and 1964 Winter Olympics.

He won a bronze medal in the 4x10 km relay at the 1962 FIS Nordic World Ski Championships.

Vaganov was awarded Order of the Badge of Honor (1960).

External links
 
 
World Championship results 

1930 births
Olympic cross-country skiers of the Soviet Union
Olympic bronze medalists for the Soviet Union
Soviet male cross-country skiers
Cross-country skiers at the 1960 Winter Olympics
Cross-country skiers at the 1964 Winter Olympics
Living people
Armed Forces sports society athletes
Olympic medalists in cross-country skiing
Russian male cross-country skiers
FIS Nordic World Ski Championships medalists in cross-country skiing
Medalists at the 1960 Winter Olympics
Medalists at the 1964 Winter Olympics